Neeltje "Nel" Wambach (born 9 May 1938) is a former artistic gymnast from the Netherlands. She competed at the 1960 Summer Olympics in all artistic gymnastics events with the best achievement of 14th place in the team allaround.

She won a bronze allround medal at the national championships in 1959.

References

1938 births
Living people
Dutch female artistic gymnasts
Gymnasts at the 1960 Summer Olympics
Olympic gymnasts of the Netherlands
Sportspeople from Rotterdam